Coralliocaris is a genus of shrimps belonging to the family Palaemonidae.

The species of this genus are found in Indian and Pacific Ocean.

Species:

Coralliocaris brevirostris 
Coralliocaris graminea 
Coralliocaris junckeri 
Coralliocaris labyrintha 
Coralliocaris macrophthalma 
Coralliocaris macropthalma 
Coralliocaris nudirostris 
Coralliocaris sandyi 
Coralliocaris superba 
Coralliocaris taiwanensis 
Coralliocaris tridens 
Coralliocaris viridis

References

Palaemonidae